The 2010 OEC Taipei Ladies Open was a women's professional tennis tournament played on indoor carpet courts. It was the third edition of the OEC Taipei Ladies Open, and was part of the $100,000 tournaments of the 2010 ITF Women's Circuit. It took place at the Taipei Arena in Taipei City, Taiwan, from November 1 to November 7, 2010.

WTA entrants

Seeds

 Rankings as of October 25, 2010.

Other entrants
The following players received wildcards into the singles main draw:
  Chan Chin-wei
  Chen Yi
  Chuang Chia-jung
  Yan Zi

The following players received entry from the qualifying draw:
  Juan Ting-fei
  Yumi Nakano 
  Jessy Rompies
  Yasmin Schnack

The following player received entry via the Junior Exempt (JE) spot:
  Kristina Mladenovic

Champions

Singles

 Peng Shuai def.  Ayumi Morita, 6–1, 6–4.
 It was Peng's 1st title of the year and the 8th of her career.

Doubles

 Chang Kai-chen /  Chuang Chia-jung def.  Hsieh Su-wei /  Sania Mirza, 6–4, 6–2.
 It was Chang's 2nd title of the year and 7th of her career
 It was Chuang's 1st title of the year and 30th of her career

References

OEC Taipei Ladies Open
Taipei WTA Ladies Open
2010 in Taiwanese tennis
2010 in Taiwanese women's sport